Barabattoai is a genus of cnidarians belonging to the family Faviidae.

Species:

Barabattoai amicorum 
Barabattoai laddi 
Barabattoai mirabilis

References

Mussidae
Scleractinia genera